Charalampos "Babis" Drosos (1927 – February 2015) was a Greek footballer who played as a forward. He competed in the men's tournament at the 1952 Summer Olympics.

Honours

Olympiacos
Panhellenic Championship: 1950–51, 1953–54, 1954–55, 1955–56
Greek Cup: 1950–51, 1951–52, 1952–53, 1953–54
Piraeus FCA Championship: 1950, 1951, 1952, 1953, 1954, 1955, 1956

References

External links

1927 births
2015 deaths
Greece international footballers
Olympic footballers of Greece
Footballers at the 1952 Summer Olympics
Olympiacos F.C. players
Association football forwards
Mediterranean Games gold medalists for Greece
Mediterranean Games medalists in football
Footballers  at the 1951 Mediterranean Games
Footballers from Athens
Greek footballers